The Curse of Clara: A Holiday Tale is a Canadian animated television film, which aired on CBC Television in 2015. Based on the autobiographical short story "The Curse of Clara, or My Big Fat Disappointment" by Vickie Fagan, the film centres on her experience as a young girl studying ballet at Canada's National Ballet School who is cast in the role of Clara in the school's annual production of The Nutcracker, only to learn of the longstanding legend that the role is cursed because nobody who played Clara as a student has ever gone on to play the starring role of the Sugar Plum Fairy as a professional adult dancer. Her only guide through her fears and worries is her crush on hockey star Phil Esposito, whom she regularly imagines coaching and guiding her dancing.

The film premiered on December 14, 2015 on CBC Television, before receiving a repeat airing on Christmas Day.

At the 5th Canadian Screen Awards in 2016, the film won the award for Best Animated Program or Series.

Cast
Saara Chaudry as Victoria "Vickie" Fagan of Niagara Falls
Chloe Gillard as Peter
Zoe Fraser as Bella
Sara Botsford as the ballet mistress
Sheila McCarthy as the narrator
Phil Esposito as himself
Karen Kain as herself
Bob Cole as himself

References

External links

2015 television films
2015 films
Canadian animated television films
Canadian Screen Award-winning films
CBC Television original films
Films based on The Nutcracker and the Mouse King
2010s Canadian films